Wymberley deRenne Coerr (died October 5, 1996) was an American politician and diplomat. He served as acting Assistant Secretary of State for Inter-American Affairs in 1961, between the terms of Thomas C. Mann and Robert F. Woodward. He also served as Ambassador to Uruguay from 1962 to 1965 and Ambassador to Ecuador until 1967.

Coerr, an alumnus of Yale University and the Naval War College, died at a clinic in Ajijic, Mexico due to complications from Parkinson's Disease.

References

1996 deaths
United States Department of State officials
Ambassadors of the United States to Uruguay
Ambassadors of the United States to Ecuador
Yale University alumni
Naval War College alumni
People from Ajijic